Morten Green (born 19 March 1981) is a Danish former professional ice hockey player who lastly played for the Danish team Rungsted IK. He participated at the 2010 IIHF World Championship as a member of the Danish national team.

Green joined the Schwenninger Wild Wings on a one-year contract from the Hannover Scorpions on 8 July 2013. After two seasons with the Wild Wings, Green was released as a free agent.

References

External links
 

1981 births
Living people
Danish ice hockey forwards
Hannover Scorpions players
Leksands IF players
IF Troja/Ljungby players
Malmö Redhawks players
Modo Hockey players
Nordsjælland Cobras players
People from Hørsholm Municipality
Rögle BK players
Schwenninger Wild Wings players
Sportspeople from the Capital Region of Denmark